The 1898–99 season was Burslem Port Vale's fifth season of football in the English Football League; it followed a two-season absence, which the club spent in the Midland Football League. A solid return to the Football League, they finished in mid-table. They had the strongest defence in the division as they conceded less goals than any other team in the division. It was instead a lack of firepower in front of goal that prevented a push for promotion.

Winning their opening six league games, just two points gained from their final five games ensured a top two position was out of their reach. Safety from the lottery of re-election was never in doubt though, as they finished nineteen points above the re-election places. Over the next eight seasons they never bettered their league finish of 1898–99, though they twice equalled it.

Overview

Second Division
Their FA Cup win over First Division champions Sheffield United in 1897–98 won Vale the respect (and votes) they needed to win re-election to the Football League for 1898–99. To ensure a competitive campaign they signed striker Howard Harvey from Aston Villa for £50. Winning their opening six league games, the semi-professional side conceded just one goal in this run. However Tommy Clare broke a leg at their final win of the streak of six, and their run ended at Newton Heath the following week – the team badly missed Clare. Their fading hopes of promotion were bolstered by four wins in January, including a 6–1 win over Blackpool aided by a four-goal haul from James Peake. Yet they finished the season with two points from five games, dropping into ninth place – their lowest position all season.

Of the two clubs that failed to gain re-election, Darwen, who picked up a League record eighteen consecutive defeats, played regional football for the rest of their existence; whereas Blackpool gained re-election at the end of the following season, and never lost their League status again.

Right-half Lucien Boullemier was an ever-present throughout the campaign, with goalkeeper Herbert Birchenough missing just one game. Winger Billy Heames and forward Howard Harvey rarely missed a game between them.

Finances
Financially, the club lost £300 over the season.

Cup competitions
Defending champions of the Staffordshire Senior Cup, Vale reached the semi-final, where they lost 4–0 to Walsall in a replay. In the Birmingham Senior Cup, they defeated Walsall in the semi-final, in a replay, going on to lose 4–0 to Aston Villa in the final. In the FA Cup they were turned over 7–0 at Small Heath in the qualification rounds.

League table

Results

Burslem Port Vale's score comes first

Football League Second Division

Results by matchday

Matches

FA Cup

Birmingham Senior Cup

Staffordshire Senior Cup

Player statistics

Appearances

Top scorers

Transfers

Transfers in

Transfers out

References
Specific

General

Port Vale F.C. seasons
Burslem Port Vale